Stig Ragnar Lindbäck (2 October 1937 – 14 March 1999) was a Swedish middle-distance runner. He competed in the 800 m and 1500 m events at the 1964 Olympics, but failed to reach the finals. Lindbäck won the national 800 m title in 1962.

References

1937 births
1999 deaths
Swedish male middle-distance runners
Olympic athletes of Sweden
Athletes (track and field) at the 1964 Summer Olympics
Sportspeople from Norrbotten County